Utah Valley University (UVU) is a public university in Orem, Utah. UVU offers master's, bachelor's, associate degrees, and certificates. Previously called Utah Valley State College, the school attained university status in July 2008.

History

Central Utah Vocational School 
The school was founded in the fall of 1941, when the Utah State Vocational Office consolidated federal work program classes into one campus in Provo, just west of the campus of Brigham Young University. At this time, the school was known as Central Utah Vocational School (CUVS).

Utah Trade Technical Institute 
Growth brought numerous changes to the school over the following decades, and it was renamed several times to reflect its changing role. In 1963, the name was changed from CUVS to Utah Trade Technical Institute.

Utah Technical College at Provo 

In 1967, the school became Utah Technical College in Provo and was given the authority to confer associate degrees for the first time. In 1977, the institution began moving to its present location, at the junction of I-15 and University Parkway in Orem.

Utah Valley Community College 
In 1987, it became Utah Valley Community College.

Utah Valley State College 
In 1993, the school was named UVSC and began awarding four-year degrees. The Utah legislature approved renaming UVSC as a university in February 2007 (effective July 1, 2008), allowing it to begin offering master's degrees, although the school continues to emphasize its two- and four-year degree programs.

Utah Valley University 
On July 1, 2008, UVSC changed to UVU, officially changing to university. As of Fall Semester 2018, the Utah System of Higher Education (USHE) reported UVU as the largest university in the state for the fourth year in a row with 39,931 students, surpassing the University of Utah.

UVU is the largest employer in Orem, with over 1,900 full-time faculty and staff and over 3,300 part-time faculty and staff.

When it was a community college, the school had 8,000 students enrolled, growing by approximately 3,000 students a year.
The university had 32,670 students enrolled for the 2010 fall semester. 31,556 students were enrolled for the fall of 2012.

Dr. Astrid S. Tuminez has been the institution's 7th president since 2018 and is the university's first female president.  Tuminez was selected by the Utah State Board of Regents in 2018 and was preceded by Matthew S. Holland.

Academics
UVU is accredited by the Northwest Commission on Colleges and Universities. Individual programs, schools and colleges, and departments are accredited, certified, or recognized by 19 specialized accreditation agencies. Vocational accreditation was granted in 1976, and renewed in 1990 and 1995 by the Utah State Office of Vocational Education. In December 2006, the UVU School of Business received initial accreditation from the AACSB, which was maintained in 2011.

About 88% of UVU students come from Utah, but an increasing number of students come from other states and countries. In 2016, UVU students represented all 50 US states, the District of Columbia, and 74 countries.

UVU's in-state tuition and fees cost roughly $5,530 (2016–17); out-of-state tuition and fees are $15,690 (2016–17).

UVU has a 100% acceptance rate. As of 2021, it holds a US ranking of #369 according to Forbes. For 2022, U.S. News & World Report ranked UVU #94-#122 in Regional Universities West and #114 in Social Mobility for that region's universities.

Campuses

UVU's main campus is in Orem with satellite campuses in Heber City, Spanish Fork, North Orem, Provo Municipal Airport, and Lehi. UVU's main campus encompasses  and includes 48 buildings.

Each building has been built using the same style of unfinished concrete (before 2005), with all of the major buildings on campus connected by  concourses. UVU grounds include two reflecting ponds on the west side of campus, a stream running through the east part of campus, and a multi-dimensional fountain in the middle of campus.

UVU is home to the Utah Community Credit Union Center,  formerly the David O. McKay Events Center which was built in 1996 with a capacity to seat 8,500 people. The events center is governed by a board of representatives from UVU, Utah County, and Orem City. It not only holds campus activities and sporting events but also community events such as major concerts, trade shows and expos, high school sports tournaments, family shows, graduations, and banquets. It is also home to UVU's culinary arts program, including Greg's Restaurant. On average, the Events Center hosts 150–170 events per year. As many as 360,000 people patronize the Events Center on an annual basis. {
  "type": "FeatureCollection",
  "features": [
    {
      "type": "Feature",
      "properties": {},
      "geometry": {
        "type": "Point",
        "coordinates": [
          -111.71543911099435,
          40.27684962500439
        ]
      }
    },
    {
      "type": "Feature",
      "properties": {},
      "geometry": {
        "type": "Point",
        "coordinates": [
          -111.72911167145,
          40.280180467456
        ]
      }
    }
  ]
}

Digital Learning Center

In September 2006, the school began construction of a new Digital Learning Center to replace the  Losee Resource Center (library). It opened on July 1, 2008. UVU President William A. Sederburg hired Cooper, Roberts, Simonsen and Associates, and Layton Construction as the design/build team for the new Digital Learning Center, with acclaimed New York architect Jacob Alspector as lead architect. "We chose the design we’re going with because it was an exceptional design that still kept a lot of the same features of our current campus. So it looks like it’s supposed to be there yet it stands out," said Jim Michaelis, associate vice president of Facilities Planning. The $48 million project includes networked computers, computer labs, a computer reference area (Information Commons), a media center, 31 study rooms, and wireless internet throughout the building. In 2016 money was donated to the Library by Ira A. Fulton and Mary Lou Fulton, and it was renamed Fulton Library.

The library is the "greenest" state-owned building in Utah and won two 2008 awards from Intermountain Construction magazine for its energy efficiency.

List of buildings on main campus 

 Browning Administration
 Clarke Building
 Computer Science & Engineering
 UCCU Center
 Environmental Technology
 Fulton Library
 Gunther Technology
 Liberal Arts
 Losee Center
 McKay Education
 Noorda Center for the Performing Arts
 Pope Science Building
 Rebecca D. Lockhart Arena
 Sparks Automotive
 Science Building
 Sorensen Center
 Student Life & Wellness 
 Woodbury Business Building
 Wolverine Services.

Science building
The UVU Science Building opened in the summer of 2012. The building features study rooms to the west side that have glass whiteboards as well as windows spanning the entire height of the towers. In addition, ZOOL 2320 students can enjoy the new Anatomy Lab, which has vents to decrease the concentration of Phenol in the air.

Organization

UVU is part of the USHE, with the following primary colleges and schools:

 College of Humanities and Social Sciences
 College of Science
 College of Engineering and Technology
 College of Health and Public Service
 School of the Arts
 School of Education
 University College
 Woodbury School of Business
 
Other academic support programs include the Office of Engaged Learning, the Office of Teaching and Learning, Extended Studies, Summer, Concurrent Enrollment, Professional and Continuing Education, Academic Service-Learning, and Honors.

Performing arts

Ballroom dance 
UVU is home to one of the largest public collegiate ballroom dance programs in the United States. The company has over 130 members divided into four teams; one touring team, one reserve, and two backup teams. The backup teams provide the students with the training and performance skills necessary to meet the demands of the touring team. The UVU Ballroom Dance Company has received numerous awards, honors, and accolades as they have performed and competed throughout the United States and abroad, including recently winning the first ever College Dance Championship on ABC's TV series Dancing With The Stars.

Music
UVU has ten main musical groups. The four choir groups are Chamber Choir, Deep Green, Emerald Singers, and Concert Choir. The two orchestra groups are Symphony Orchestra and Chamber Orchestra. Band-related groups include Wind Symphony, Jazz Band, Pep Band, University Band, and Percussion Ensemble.

Theatre 
The UVU Theatre program produces five shows each year on its mainstage season.  In addition, the president of the university selects a title each year as part of the freshman reading program that the department stages in the university's courtyard.  The department partners with the Sundance Resort to produce Sundance Summer Theatre each year.  The university creates a play that travels and performs in the Edinburgh Fringe Festival as part of its annual Theatre Semester Abroad to London and Scotland.  They also host the Rocky Mountain Summer Stock Theatre Auditions each year, where college students from across the region audition for professional summer stock theatres.   UVU is the first university in the nation to win back to back national awards from the Kennedy Center American College Theater Festival.  In 2013 they won Outstanding Production of a Play for ‘Vincent in Brixton’ written by Nicholas Wright and directed by Christopher Clark.  In 2014 UVU won Outstanding Production of a Musical for the Pulitzer Prize winning ‘Next to Normal’ with book and lyrics by Brian Yorkey, music by Tom Kitt, directed by David Tinney, and music direction by Rob Moffat.  Other national KCACTF awards UVU repeated include Outstanding Director and Outstanding Performance by an Actress.

Athletics

The school mascot is the Wolverine, and the colors are green and white. The Wolverines compete in the Western Athletic Conference.

Men's Intercollegiate Sports
 Baseball
 Basketball
 Cross Country
 Golf
 Soccer
 Track and field 
 Wrestling

Women's Intercollegiate Sports
 Basketball
 Cross Country
 Golf
 Soccer
 Softball
 Track and field
 Volleyball

The UVU student section was changed to “The Den” in the beginning of the 2017-2018 school year. It was previously called Mighty Athletic Wolverine League, or “MAWL”

The Wolverines play their home basketball games in the 8,500-seat UCCU Center. The baseball team plays at UCCU Ballpark, a 5,000-seat facility that was also formerly home of the Orem Owlz, a minor-league affiliate of Los Angeles Angels of Anaheim, that competed in the Pioneer Baseball League. Track and Field compete at the Hal Wing Track & Field. Softball at the Wolverine Field. And, Volleyball and Wrestling competed in Lockhart Arena.

Media
The school has an independent, student-run weekly newspaper called the UVU Review. The newspaper began publishing under the name on June 30, 2008, the day before the university transition became official. The school is also the subject of the documentary This Divided State.

Utah Fire and Rescue Academy
The school is one of few Utah universities which provides free training to Utah fire agencies. In August 2009, the university unveiled a Mobile Command Center, acquired by federal grants. The Utah Valley University Fire Academy Mobile Command Training Center cost an estimated $200,000 to $300,000 and provides both students and firefighters with realistic fire training.

Notable alumni
Reyna I. Aburto – former second counselor to Jean B. Bingham in the General Relief Society Presidency of the Church of Jesus Christ of Latter-day Saints
Christopher Fogt – Olympic silver medalist in four-man Bobsleigh
Akwasi Frimpong - Ghana skeleton athlete, 2018 Olympian
Matt Gay - Professional football player (two seasons at UVU before transfer to University of Utah)
Andreas Gustafsson (born 1981) - Swedish race walker
Gregg Hale – former guitarist for the band Spiritualized
Andrew Hales – YouTuber (did not graduate)
Travis Hansen – professional basketball player (transferred to Brigham Young University)
Chelsie Hightower – a professional dancer on TV series Dancing with the Stars and So You Think You Can Dance
Jef Holm – Winner of The Bachelorette Season 8
Mitch Jones – Professional baseball player
Ricky Lundell – 3rd-degree black belt in Gracie Brazilian Jiu-Jitsu, high school wrestling coach
Michael McDonald – professional basketball player
Kam Mickolio – Professional baseball player
Trevor Milton – Founder, former chairman and CEO, Nikola Corporation
Ramsey Nijem – Wrestler; professional mixed martial artist, The Ultimate Fighter 13 finalist, Lightweight fighter for the UFC
Noelle Pikus Pace – World Cup gold medalist and Olympic silver medalist in Skeleton
Matthew S. Petersen – Chairman of the Federal Election Commission, and former Republican chief counsel to the United States Senate Committee on Rules and Administration
Ronnie Price – Professional basketball player
Wesley Silcox – World champion bull rider
Matangi Tonga – Professional football player

See also
Roots of Knowledge, a stained glass display in the Fulton Library on campus

References

External links

Utah Valley Athletics website

 
Mormon studies
Public universities and colleges in Utah
Educational institutions established in 1941
Universities and colleges accredited by the Northwest Commission on Colleges and Universities
Universities and colleges in Utah County, Utah
1941 establishments in Utah
Buildings and structures in Orem, Utah